Owlet-nightjars are small crepuscular birds related to the nightjars and frogmouths. Most are native to New Guinea, but some species extend to Australia, the Moluccas, and New Caledonia. A flightless species from New Zealand is extinct. There is a single monotypic family Aegothelidae with the genus Aegotheles.

Owlet-nightjars are insectivores which hunt mostly in the air but sometimes on the ground; their soft plumage is a cryptic mixture of browns and paler shades, they have fairly small, weak feet (but larger and stronger than those of a frogmouth or a nightjar), a tiny bill that opens extraordinarily wide, surrounded by prominent whiskers. The wings are short, with 10 primaries and about 11 secondaries; the tail long and rounded.

Systematics
A comprehensive 2003 study analyzing mtDNA sequences Cytochrome b and ATPase subunit 8 suggests that 11 living species of owlet-nightjar should be recognized, as well as another that became extinct early in the second millennium AD.

The relationship between the owlet-nightjars and the (traditional) Caprimulgiformes has long been controversial and obscure and remains so today: in the 19th century they were regarded as a subfamily of the frogmouths, and they are still generally considered to be related to the frogmouths and/or the nightjars. It appears though that they are not as closely related to either as previously thought, and that the owlet-nightjars share a more recent common ancestor with the Apodiformes. As has been suggested on occasion since morphological studies of the cranium in the 1960s, they are thus considered a distinct order, Aegotheliformes. This, the caprimulgiform lineage(s), and the Apodiformes, are postulated to form a clade called Cypselomorphae, with the owlet-nightjars and the Apodiformes forming the clade Daedalornithes.

In form and habits, however, they are very similar to both caprimulgiform group – or, at first glance, to small owls with huge eyes. The ancestors of the swifts and hummingbirds, two groups of birds which are morphologically very specialized, seem to have looked very similar to a small owlet-nightjar, possessing strong legs and a wide gape, while the legs and feet are very reduced in today's swifts and hummingbirds, and the bill is narrow in the latter.

Owlet-nightjars are an exclusively Australasian group, but close relatives apparently thrived all over Eurasia in the late Paleogene.

Taxonomy

Family Aegothelidae
 Genus Quipollornis Rich & McEvey 1977 (Early/Middle Miocene of New South Wales)
 †Quipollornis koniberi Rich & McEvey 1977
 Genus Aegotheles
 †New Zealand owlet-nightjar, Aegotheles novaezealandiae (Scarlett 1968) (prehistoric; formerly Megaegotheles)
 New Caledonian owlet-nightjar, Aegotheles savesi Layard & Layard 1881
 Feline owlet-nightjar, Aegotheles insignis Salvadori 1876
 Starry owlet-nightjar or spangled owlet-nightjar, Aegotheles tatei Rand 1941
 Moluccan owlet-nightjar or long-whiskered owlet-nightjar, Aegotheles crinifrons (Bonaparte 1850)
 Australian owlet-nightjar, Aegotheles cristatus (Shaw 1790)
 A. c. cristatus (Shaw 1790)
 A. c. tasmanicus Mathews 1918
 Vogelkop owlet-nightjar, Aegotheles affinis Salvadori 1876
 Barred owlet-nightjar, Aegotheles bennettii Salvadori & Albertis 1875
 A. b. bennettii Salvadori & Albertis 1875
 A. b. plumifer Ramsay 1883
 A. b. terborghi Diamond 1967
 A. b. wiedenfeldi Laubmann 1914
 Wallace's owlet-nightjar, Aegotheles wallacii Gray 1859
 A. w. gigas Rothschild 1931
 A. w. manni Diamond 1969
 A. w. wallacii Gray 1859
 Mountain owlet-nightjar, Aegotheles albertisi Sclater 1874
 A. a. albertisi Sclater 1874 (Arfak owlet-nightjar)
 A. a. wondiwoi Mayr & Rand 1936
 A. a. salvadorii (Hartert 1892) (Salvadori's owlet-nightjar)

A fossil proximal right tarsometatarsus (MNZ S42800) was found at the Bannockburn Formation of the Manuherikia Group near the Manuherikia River in Otago, New Zealand. Dating from the Early to Middle Miocene (Altonian, 19-16 million years ago), it seems to represent an owlet-nightjar ancestral to A. novaezealandiae. In 2022, an additional specimen from the same locality was described by Worthy et al. as a new extinct species of Aeotheles, A. zealandivetus. The holotype specimen is NMNZ S.52917, a distal right tarsometatarsus.

Footnotes

References
 Dumbacher, John P. ; Pratt, Thane K. & Fleischer, Robert C. (2003): Phylogeny of the owlet-nightjars (Aves: Aegothelidae) based on mitochondrial DNA sequence. Mol. Phylogenet. Evol. 29(3): 540–549.  PDF fulltext
 Mayr, Gerald (2002): Osteological evidence for paraphyly of the avian order Caprimulgiformes (nightjars and allies). J. Ornithol. 143(1): 82–97.  PDF fulltext
 Simonetta, A.M. (1967): Cinesi e morfologia del cranio negli Uccelli non passeriformi. Studio su varie tendenze evolutive. Part II – Striges, Caprimulgiformes ed Apodiformes ["Cranial kinesis and morphology of non-passerine birds. Study of various evolutionary tendencies. Part II – Striges, Caprimulgiformes and Apodiformes"]. [In Italian] Archivio Zoologico Italiano 52: 1–35.
 Worthy, Trevor H.; Tennyson, A.J.D.; Jones, C.; McNamara, J.A. & Douglas, B.J. (2007): Miocene waterfowl and other birds from central Otago, New Zealand. J. Syst. Palaeontol. 5(1): 1–39.  (HTML abstract)

Aegotheliformes
Nightjars
 
Taxa named by Nicholas Aylward Vigors